Drillia cunninghamae is a species of sea snail, a marine gastropod mollusk in the family Drilliidae.

Description

Distribution

References

  Tucker, J.K. 2004 Catalog of recent and fossil turrids (Mollusca: Gastropoda). Zootaxa 682:1–1295
 McLean & Poorman, 1971. New species of Tropical Eastern Pacific Turridae; The Veliger, 14, 89–113

External links
 
 BioLib:  Drillia cunninghamae

cunninghamae
Gastropods described in 1971